The Nickelodeon Saturday programming block, known as Gotta See Saturdays from 2012 to 2013, Nick's New Saturday Night from 2014, Nick's Saturday Night from 2015 to 2017 and A Night of Premieres from 2018 to 2021 was the program block branding of Nickelodeon's Saturday morning and Saturday evening programming on the flagship channel in the United States. The morning block (airing from 10:00 a.m.-12:30 p.m ET/PT) mainly features new premieres of Nicktoons programming, with the evening block (from 7:30 p.m.-10:00 p.m ET/PT) consisting of the network's original live-action sitcoms. The branding launched on September 22, 2012, with season premieres of the respective series in both dayparts. The evening version of Gotta See Saturdays was a direct successor to the former Saturday night SNICK (1992–2005) and TEENick (2001–2009) blocks.

On March 31, 2018, the branding for Nick's Saturday night premieres was known as A Night of Premieres, with the premiere of the newest original series Star Falls and Knight Squad alongside season 4 of Henry Danger. In late 2020, Nickelodeon stopped premiering new episodes of animated series on Saturday mornings, instead premiering them on Friday nights. The branding was discontinued on November 20, 2021, with Nick moving its live-action comedy premieres to Thursday nights starting on January 6, 2022 (making it then first time since 1992 that Nickelodeon hasn't aired a new episode of a live-action show or an animated show on Saturdays). In its previous brandings, one of the first acquired programming to air in this format was TeenNick Top 10 from sister channel TeenNick. On February 25, 2017, Nickelodeon began promoting the Saturday morning block as The Saturday Morning Hang Zone with Lincoln Loud, themed to The Loud House. The block was discontinued on March 23, 2017.

Programming

Final programming

Live-action series 
 Tyler Perry's Young Dylan (February 29, 2020 – August 21, 2021)
 Danger Force (March 28, 2020 – November 20, 2021)
 Side Hustle (November 7, 2020 – November 20, 2021)
 Power Rangers Dino Fury (February 20, 2021 – November 20, 2021)

Former programming

Animated series 
 SpongeBob SquarePants (May 1, 1999 – 2020)
 The Fairly OddParents (March 30, 2001 – March 28, 2015) 
 The Penguins of Madagascar (November 29, 2008 – November 10, 2012) 
 T.U.F.F. Puppy (October 2, 2010 – 2012) 
 Kung Fu Panda: Legends of Awesomeness (November 7, 2011 – June 29, 2014) 
 Robot and Monster (August 4, 2012 – December 8, 2012)
 Teenage Mutant Ninja Turtles (September 29, 2012 – November 12, 2017) 
 Monsters vs. Aliens (March 23, 2013 – February 8, 2014)
 Sanjay and Craig (May 25, 2013 – July 25, 2015)
 Rabbids Invasion (August 3, 2013 – February 7, 2016) 
 Breadwinners  (February 17, 2014 – December 11, 2015)
 Harvey Beaks (March 28 – July 25, 2015; October 15, 2016)
 Pig Goat Banana Cricket (July 18 – August 8, 2015)
 The Loud House (October 15, 2016; November 11, 2017; 2019 – May 23, 2020)
 Bunsen is a Beast (2017)
 Rise of the Teenage Mutant Ninja Turtles (September 22, 2018 – October 13, 2019)
 The Casagrandes (October 19, 2019 – May 30, 2020)
 It's Pony (January 18 – December 4, 2020)

Live-action series 
 iCarly (2007 – 2012)
 Big Time Rush (2009 – 2013)
 Victorious (2010 – 2013)
 Power Rangers Samurai (2011 – 2012)
 Supah Ninjas (2011 – 2013)
 How to Rock (2012)
 Marvin Marvin (2012 – 2013)
 Power Rangers Megaforce (2013 – 2014)
 Wendell & Vinnie (2013)
 Sam & Cat (2013 – 2014)
 AwesomenessTV (2013 – 2015)
 The Haunted Hathaways (2013 – 2015)
 The Thundermans (2013 –  2018)
 Henry Danger (2014 – 2020)
 Nicky, Ricky, Dicky & Dawn (2014 – 2018)
 100 Things To Do Before High School (2014 - 2016)
 Bella and the Bulldogs (2015 - 2016)
 Power Rangers Dino Charge (2015 - 2016)
 Game Shakers (2015 - 2019)
 School of Rock (2016 - 2018)
 Legendary Dudas (2016)
 Power Rangers Ninja Steel (2017 – 2018)
 Knight Squad (2018 – 2019)
 Star Falls (2018)
 Cousins for Life (2018 – 2019)
 Power Rangers Beast Morphers (2019 – 2020)
 All That (Revival) (2019 – 2020)
 Group Chat (2020)
 Nickelodeon's Unfiltered (2020 – 2021)
 Tooned In (March 6, 2021)
 Drama Club (2021)

Acquired programming 
 NFL Rush Zone (February 2, 2013)
 Digimon Fusion (September 7, 2013 – October 5, 2013)
 TeenNick Top 10 (August 16, 2014 – November 22, 2014)
 Alvinnn!!! and the Chipmunks (2015; 2017)
 Miraculous (August 13, 2016 – October 22, 2016)
 Regal Academy (August 13, 2016 – April 29, 2017)
 Kuu Kuu Harajuku (October 8, 2016 – March 4, 2017)
 Lego City Adventures (June 22, 2019 – 2020)
 Lego Jurassic World: Legend of Isla Nublar (September 14, 2019 – 2020)

See also
 SNICK

References

Nickelodeon programming blocks
Saturday mass media